Halleh Ghorashi (also spelled Ghoreishi; born 30 July 1962) is an Iranian-born anthropologist who lives in the Netherlands. From 2005 to 2012, she held the PaVEM chair in Management of Diversity and Integration in the Department of Organization Sciences at Vrije Universiteit in Amsterdam. She won the 2008 Triumph Prize (Prize de Triomf).

Biography
Halleh Ghorashi was born on 30 July 1962 in Tehran, Pahlavi Iran (now Iran). She grew up in Iran, and came to the Netherlands in 1988 as a political refugee. She studied cultural anthropology at Vrije Universiteit Amsterdam, and received her Ph.D. at University of Nijmegen in May 2001, with a doctoral dissertation titled Ways to Survive, Battles to Win: Iranian Women Exiles in the Netherlands and the U.S. In 2005, she was appointed professor, and in 2006, she became the first occupant of the chair for Management of Diversity and Integration, endowed by PaVEM, the Dutch government's Committee for Participation of Women of Ethnic Minority Groups. Her inauguration was attended by Princess Máxima of the Netherlands, chair of PaVEM and was widely covered in the Dutch media.

In 2008, Ghorashi was co-organizer of a conference on the Muslim diaspora. In 2009, she was a speaker at a protest in front of the Binnenhof (Dutch Parliament Building).

Halleh Ghorashi is cited as a proponent of more inclusive political thought, countering the Dutch political climate of the early 21st century with its strong populist and anti-Islamic discourse. Ghorashi  argues that when immigrants are maligned and excluded from political debate integration into Dutch society cannot be expected.

In 2010, Dutch feminist magazine Opzij listed her as one of the most powerful women in the Netherlands.

Ghorashi was elected a member of the Royal Netherlands Academy of Arts and Sciences in 2020.

Publications

Books
Ways to Survive, Battles to Win: Iranian Women Exiles in the Netherlands and the US. New York: Nova Science, 2003. .
The Transnational Construction of Local Conflicts and Protests Nijmegen : Stichting Focaal, 2006. OCLC 603051165
 (with Sharam Alghasi & Thomas Hylland Eriksen) Paradoxes of cultural recognition : perspectives from Northern Europe Ashgate, 2009. .
Review, by Dix Eeke, in Nations and Nationalism, 16, no. 1 (2010): 192-194.
 (ed. with Haideh Moghissi) Muslim Diaspora in the West : Negotiating gender, home and belonging. Ashgate, 2010. .

Papers and reports
1990s

"Iranian Islamic and Secular Feminists: Allies or Enemies?" Series: Occasional paper (Middle East Research Associates), 27. 1996.

2000s

 
 

2010s

 With: Szepietowska, E. (2010). "Diversiteit is niet alleen kleur in organisaties . Diversiteitsbeleid en –praktijk in de Nederlandse Goede Doelen Organisaties". Utrecht: UAF.
 With: ten Holder, F. (2012). "Kleine stappen van grote betekenis: een nieuw perspectief op humane opvang van asielzoekers " Amsterdam: Stichting de Vrolijkheid.
 With: 
 With:

References

External links
Ghorashi's website

1962 births
Living people
Dutch anthropologists
Iranian anthropologists
Iranian women anthropologists
Iranian emigrants to the Netherlands
Iranian expatriate academics
Members of the Royal Netherlands Academy of Arts and Sciences
People from Tehran
Radboud University Nijmegen alumni
Vrije Universiteit Amsterdam alumni
Academic staff of Vrije Universiteit Amsterdam
Women human rights activists